Kathal Paduthum Padu is a 1966 Indian Tamil-language romantic drama film directed by Joseph Thaliath Jr and produced under Citadel Studios. The film stars Jaishankar and Vanisri, the latter's debut in Tamil cinema. It was released on 7 October 1966 and became a commercial success. The film was remade in Telugu as Premalo Pramadam (1967).

Plot

Cast 
Lead cast
 Jaishankar as Raju
 Vanisri as Suguna

Male supporting cast
 K. A. Thangavelu as Achu
 Moorthy as Vichu
 Suruli Rajan as Ponnambalam

Female supporting cast
 Pandari Bai as Raju's mother
 Vijaya Lalitha as Chandra
 Jayanthi as Maya
 Muthulakshmi as Meenakshi
 Kumari Radha as Lalli
 Sakunthala as Kalarani
 Rajeshwari
 Rama Prabha as Laila

Production 
Kathal Paduthum Padu was directed by Joseph Thaliath Jr and produced by Dominic Joseph under the banner of Citadel Studios. The story and dialogues were written by Kalaignanam. This film marked Vanisri's first lead role in Tamil. Gemini Rajeshwari (credited simply as Rajeshwari) was cast after Thaliath was impressed with her performance in the play Kannum Imaiyum. Cinematography was handled by B. B. Lucas, and editing by M. Vellaichami. It is Vellaichami's first film as editor.

Soundtrack 
The music was composed by T. R. Pappa.

Release 
Kathal Paduthum Padu was released on 7 October 1966, and became a commercial success.

References

Bibliography

External links 
 

1966 romantic drama films
1960s Tamil-language films
1966 films
Films directed by Joseph Thaliath Jr.
Films scored by T. R. Pappa
Indian romantic drama films
Tamil films remade in other languages